Daniel Borimirov Borisov (born 15 January 1970) is a Bulgarian former professional footballer who played mainly as an attacking midfielder.

Borimirov's professional playing career spanned nearly 20 years, during which he played for three clubs: Bdin Vidin, Levski Sofia and TSV 1860 Munich.

In international football, Borimirov made his Bulgaria debut on 18 February 1993 at the age of 23. He made 66 career appearances in total, appearing at two FIFA World Cup tournaments, in 1994 and 1998, and two UEFA European Championship tournaments, in 1996 and 2004.

Club career
Born in Vidin, Borimirov's club career began with local club Bdin in second league, where he made his first-team debut in 1987 at age 17. 

In 1990 Borimirov joined Levski Sofia. In the beginning, he appeared mainly as a supporting striker, but eventually reconverted to attacking midfielder. At Levski, Borimirov was very important – if not crucial – part in all of the club's six major titles during his first spell, three leagues and three cups. The biggest victory in the history of The Eternal Derby of Bulgaria (7–1 for Levski in 1994–95 A Group) is unthinkable without the two goals scored by Daniel Borimirov. After 32 goals combined in his last two years, with three back-to-back national championships, he signed with Germany's TSV 1860 Munich.

Borimirov made his Bundesliga debut on 12 August 1995, scoring twice at FC St. Pauli, albeit in a 4–2 loss, adding another two in the next two games, as the Lions eventually finished in eighth position; in the following season, he experienced his best year abroad, netting nine times in 31 matches, helping TSV qualify for the UEFA Cup.

In the following years, although used more sparingly, Borimirov continued to be an important member for Munich 1860, eventually appearing in nearly 300 official matches in his -year spell. 214 of them were in the Bundesliga. In early January 2004, one week shy of his 34th birthday, he returned to Levski, being the driving force behind the success of the club in the 2005–06 UEFA Cup, helping the capital outfit to the quarterfinals, namely scoring against Udinese Calcio and FC Schalke 04 (the latter in the stage where the club was ousted, 2–4 on aggregate).

In an interview on 16 August 2006, Borimirov stated he was attending coaching classes, intending to work in football after retiring as a player. On 1 July of the following year, he played for a FIFA All-Star team against China in an exhibition game as part of Hong Kong's ten-year independence anniversary celebrations. The miscellaneous side was coached by Gérard Houllier, and featured players like Hidetoshi Nakata, Stéphane Chapuisat, Christian Karembeu, George Weah and Brian McBride.

Borimirov still played an important part in the 2006–07 season, playing in 20 matches (four goals) as Levski won the league – and the cup. He ended his career at the age of 38, playing his last game on 17 May 2008 against city neighbours PFC Slavia Sofia, with his team winning the match.

After retiring, Borimirov served as director of football at Levski Sofia, replacing former club and national teammate Nasko Sirakov, and himself being replaced at the end of 2008–09 by Georgi Ivanov.

Controversy
In 2006, still as a player, Borimirov gained notoriety in Bulgarian football circles for his violent outbursts after controversial referee decisions. One particular accident in which he was involved in resulted in him spitting in the face of the referee. Borimirov was fined 10,000 Bulgarian lev by the Bulgarian Football Union, later apologizing for his behaviour.

Two years later, now in directorial capacities, he caused more controversy, following a match against PFC CSKA Sofia.

International career
For Bulgaria, Borimirov was capped 67 times, scoring five goals. He made his debut in 1993, being selected for the 1994 FIFA World Cup, UEFA Euro 1996, 1998 World Cup and Euro 2004, totalling 11 appearances, with one goal. He is the only Bulgarian to represent his Country in two Euros as well as two World Cups and the only Bulgarian from 1994 World Cup to take part in 2004 Euro.

In the first competition, as the national team finished in fourth place, Borimirov scored against Greece in the group stage, for Bulgaria's first ever FIFA World Cup win (4–0, in Chicago, having played only eight minutes). He also converted his penalty shootout attempt in the round of 16 win against Mexico.

Personal life
Borimirov was born in the village of Pokrayna in Vidin. In an interview with Gazeta Sporturilor, Borimirov said that his maternal grandparents are Romanian. He is married to Aphrodita and they have two children.

Career statistics

Club

International

Scores and results list Bulgaria's goal tally first, score column indicates score after each Borimirov goal.

Honours
Levski Sofia
Bulgarian League: 1992–93, 1993–94, 1994–95, 2005–06, 2006–07
Bulgarian Cup: 1990–91, 1991–92, 1993–94, 2004–05, 2006–07
Bulgarian Supercup: 2005, 2007

Bulgaria
FIFA World Cup: fourth place 1994

References

External links
 
 
 
 Profile at Levskisofia.info

1970 births
Living people
Bulgarian footballers
Bulgaria international footballers
Association football midfielders
First Professional Football League (Bulgaria) players
Bundesliga players
OFC Bdin Vidin players
PFC Levski Sofia players
TSV 1860 Munich players
1994 FIFA World Cup players
UEFA Euro 1996 players
1998 FIFA World Cup players
UEFA Euro 2004 players
Bulgarian people of Romanian descent
Bulgarian expatriate footballers
Expatriate footballers in Germany
Bulgarian expatriate sportspeople in Germany
People from Vidin